Milan H. Sessions (December 4, 1821 - April 18, 1898) was a Union Army officer in the American Civil War.  An attorney and politician, he served in several positions in Vermont, Wisconsin, and Nebraska, including prosecuting attorney and state legislator.

Biography
Milan Hebard Sessions was born on December 4, 1821 in Randolph, Vermont. In 1847, he married Caroline C. Chandler. They had three children before she died in 1857. Sessions moved to Waupaca, Wisconsin in 1855. During the American Civil War, he served with the 21st Wisconsin Volunteer Infantry Regiment of the Union Army with the rank of captain. He married Elizabeth Wilson in 1866. They had one daughter before she died in 1868. Sessions then moved to Lincoln, Nebraska in 1871. In 1878, he married Jane E. Josyslin.

Career
Sessions was State's Attorney of Washington County, Vermont from 1853 to 1854. He was District Attorney of Waupaca County, Wisconsin from 1860 to 1861. Later, Sessions was a member of the Wisconsin State Senate and of the Wisconsin State Assembly. In 1871, he was defeated for the Senate by his law partner, Myron Reed. He was a member of the Nebraska House of Representatives in 1873 and 1879, serving as Speaker of the House of Representatives during his second term.

Sessions later moved to Minneapolis, Minnesota.  He died in Minneapolis on April 18, 1898, and was buried at Lakewood Cemetery in Minneapolis.

References

External links
 The Political Graveyard
 RootsWeb

People from Randolph, Vermont
People from Waupaca, Wisconsin
Politicians from Lincoln, Nebraska
Wisconsin state senators
Members of the Wisconsin State Assembly
Members of the Nebraska House of Representatives
District attorneys in Wisconsin
People of Wisconsin in the American Civil War
Union Army officers
Vermont lawyers
State's attorneys in Vermont
1821 births
1898 deaths
Burials at Lakewood Cemetery
19th-century American politicians
19th-century American lawyers